Bernard Percival is an Antiguan politician. Minister of Education in the 1980s, he succeeded Molwyn Joseph as Minister of Heath and Social Improvement in 1999.

References

Antigua and Barbuda politicians
Living people
Government ministers of Antigua and Barbuda
Year of birth missing (living people)
Place of birth missing (living people)